Hollis Crossroads is a census-designated place and unincorporated community in Cleburne County, Alabama, United States. Its population was 665 as of the 2020 census. Hollis Crossroads is located along U.S. Route 431 between Anniston and  Wedowee and Alabama State Route 9 between Lineville to Heflin; Routes 431 and 9 intersect here. The Pleasant Grove Elementary School is located here.

Demographics

References

Census-designated places in Cleburne County, Alabama
Census-designated places in Alabama